Manuel Wilhelm (born 15 December 1980 in Ludwigsburg) is a German international rugby union player, playing for the RG Heidelberg in the Rugby-Bundesliga and the German national rugby union team.

Manuel Wilhelm plays rugby since 1986, first for RG Heidelberg, later he spent one season with league rival SC Neuenheim, before he went back to his club of origin RG Heidelberg. After his military service Wilhelm played one season for CAU Valencia in the first Spanish division, before returning to RG Heidelberg. He won two German championships (15s) with the later, in 2006 and 2007, five 7s-championships in 1998, 1999, 2003, 2005, 2009 and the German cup in 2004. He also plays beach rugby for The Romantics B.R.F.C..

He was first called up for the German national team in 2000 but could not play because of injury and did not make his debut for Germany until 2003, in a game against Sweden.

He is the founder of Germany's biggest rugby website, TotalRugby.de.

In 2012, Wilhelm proposed a reform of the German league system which was approved at the Deutsche Rugby Tag, the annual general meeting of the DRV, in mid-July 2012. The new system will see the number of clubs in the Bundesliga increased from ten to 24, the league divided into four regional divisions of six clubs each and the finals series expanded from four to eight teams.

Wilhelm's father is from Ghana while his mother is German.

Honours

Club
 German rugby union championship
 Champions: 2006, 2007
 Runners up: 1999, 2001, 2002, 2008
 German rugby union cup
 Winners: 2004

National team
 European Nations Cup - Division 2
 Champions: 2008

Stats
Manuel Wilhelm's personal statistics in club and international rugby:

Club

 As of 4 December 2013

National team

European Nations Cup

Friendlies & other competitions

 As of 4 December 2013

References

External links
 Manuel Wilhelm at scrum.com
   Manuel Wilhelm at totalrugby.de

1980 births
Living people
People from Ludwigsburg
Sportspeople from Stuttgart (region)
German sportspeople of Ghanaian descent
German rugby union players
Germany international rugby union players
SC Neuenheim players
RG Heidelberg players
Rugby union locks